Jonathan Hayden (February 20, 1979), known professionally as Jay Hayden, is an American actor. He is best known for his work in the ABC comedy-drama series The Catch (2016–17) and the Grey's Anatomy spinoff Station 19, both produced by Shondaland. He is also well known for his recurring role in Crazy Ex-Girlfriend.

Life and career
Hayden was born in Northfield, Vermont and is of half-Irish and half-Korean descent. His first major role was in the 2011 horror film State of Emergency, playing the lead. In 2012, he went to star on the Hulu mockumentary comedy-drama series, Battleground.
 
Hayden had series regular roles in the ABC comedy-drama The Catch starring Mireille Enos from 2016 to 2017. The series was canceled after two seasons. Later, he has had the recurring roles on One Day at a Time, Crazy Ex-Girlfriend, and SEAL Team. Later in 2017, Hayden was cast as a series regular in the Grey’s Anatomy spinoff Station 19.

Hayden has been in multiple TV commercials, including the Amazon Kindle Mayday ads and television programs, including How I Met Your Mother, Battleground, and Criminal ... FabriClear Bed Bug Spray.

Filmography

Film

Television

References

External links

1979 births
Living people
American male film actors
American male television actors
21st-century American male actors
American people of South Korean descent
American people of Irish descent